Abdelaziz Drissi-Kacemi served as President of the Fédération Nationale du Scoutisme Marocain, as well as the President of the Moroccan Scout Association and the Chairman of the international symposium Scouting: Youth Without Borders.

In 2000, he was awarded the 283rd Bronze Wolf, the only distinction of the World Organization of the Scout Movement, awarded by the World Scout Committee for exceptional services to world Scouting.

References

External links

Recipients of the Bronze Wolf Award
Year of birth missing
Scouting in Morocco
Place of birth missing